Jayaben Desai (2 April 1933 – 23 December 2010) was a prominent leader of the strikers in the Grunwick dispute in London in 1976.

Biography
Born in Dharmaj, Gujarat, India, Desai moved to Tanzania, East Africa, in 1956. At the age of twenty two, she married Suryakant, a factory owner. The couple were from middle class mercantile backgrounds. They later moved to Britain before the Commonwealth Immigrants Act 1968 made it harder for British passport holders from former British colonies to enter the country.

Grunwick Dispute 
In Britain, she had to take up low-paid work, first as a sewing machinist, then processing film in the Grunwick factory.  She resigned after being ordered to work overtime, and instigated a strike among the mainly Asian and female workforce. The strikers protested about working conditions, pay inequality and institutionalised racism within the company. Women were even asked why they needed to go to the toilet, and Desai counselled her colleagues not to be intimidated by this.

Desai led the strikers in their epic two-year picket from 1976 to 1978. The strike was backed by the Apex union and the local postal union initially refused to deliver the Grunwick photography laboratory post, until challenged with the support of the Tory party, at that time the government Opposition. 

Desai was an inspiring speaker and well-known speaker, speaking out against racist and sexist comments aimed at her and at the other striking workers, and criticising what she felt was a lack of support from the Trades Union Congress for her cause. 

The prime minister Jim Callaghan appointed a judge, Lord Justice Scarman to settle the dispute. Mrs Desai testified at length. Judge Scarman recommended that the union should be recognised and the sacked workers reinstated. The factory owner ignored the report and the unions backed off, leaving the Grunwick strike committee to announce the strike was over on 14 July 1978.

After the strike 
Desai returned to the sewing industry and later became a teacher at Harrow College. She passed her driving test at the age of 60 and encouraged other women to do so to increase their freedom.

Mrs Desai (as she was always referred to) recorded her thoughts for the Brent Museum and archives. In an interview by Hannah Phung of Brent Museum she said: "It was amazing, let me tell you, it was amazing.[…] tears were in my eyes to see these people […] they were hurting themselves and the police were charging them with horses and everything and still they were standing strong."

Jayaben Desai died on 23 December 2010. Her family scattered her ashes near the sources of the Indus and Ganges rivers and in Rotherhithe on the Thames.

Commemoration 
On 14 December 2016 she was named as one of seven women chosen by BBC Radio Four's Woman's Hour for their 2016 Power List, which was topped by Margaret Thatcher and also included Helen Brook, Barbara Castle, Germaine Greer, Bridget Jones and Beyoncé. A portrait of Desai by David Mansell was purchased by the National Portrait Gallery, London in 2017.

References

Sources and further reading
 Wilmer, Val, "The first preference is pride" (interview with Jayaben Desai), Time Out, 15–21 September 1978, pp. 14–15.

External links

 

1933 births
2010 deaths
British trade unionists
Indian emigrants to England
People from Gujarat
Women trade unionists
British people of Gujarati descent
Indian emigrants to Tanzania
British people of Indian descent